Harold W. Wells  was a Massachusetts politician who served as the 27th Mayor of Somerville, Massachusetts.

Mayors of Somerville, Massachusetts